WORX-FM (96.7 FM) is a radio station broadcasting a Hot Adult Contemporary format. Licensed to Madison, Indiana, United States, the station is currently owned by Dubois County Broadcasting, Inc. and features programming from Westwood One. The station is also broadcast on HD radio.

History
The station was assigned call sign WORX-FM in 1950. The station was owned by numerous families until 1980, when Dubois County Broadcasting bought the station. On January 10, 1981, the station changed its call sign to WCJC. On January 4, 1987, the station changed back to the current WORX-FM.

References

External links

ORX-FM
Hot adult contemporary radio stations in the United States